Subhash Khot  (born June 10, 1978 in Ichalkaranji) is an Indian-American mathematician and theoretical computer scientist who is the Julius Silver Professor of Computer Science in the Courant Institute of Mathematical Sciences at New York University. Khot's unexpected and original contributions are providing critical insight into unresolved problems in the field of computational complexity. He is best known for his unique games conjecture.

Khot was awarded the 2014 Rolf Nevanlinna Prize by the International Mathematical Union. He received the MacArthur Fellowship in 2016  and was elected a Fellow of the Royal Society in 2017.

Education
Early in his schooling days, as a Marathi-medium student, Khot was identified as a very bright student by Vyankatrao high school head master V. G. Gogate. He topped secondary and higher secondary school board exams as well.
Khot topped the IIT-JEE exam and later obtained his bachelor's degree in computer science from the Indian Institute of Technology Bombay in 1999.

He received his doctorate degree in computer science from Princeton University in 2003 under the supervision of Sanjeev Arora. He also received an honorable mention in the ACM Doctoral Dissertation Award in 2003 for his dissertation, "New Techniques for Probabilistically Checkable Proofs and Inapproximability Results."

Honours and awards
Khot is a two time silver medalist representing India at the International Mathematical Olympiad in the years 1994 and 1995.

In 1995, Khot topped the Indian Institute of Technology Joint Entrance Examination.

In 2005, he received the Microsoft Research New Faculty Fellowship Award. The fellowship recognizes innovative, promising new faculty members who are exploring breakthrough, high-impact research that has the potential to help solve some of today's most challenging societal problems.

In 2010, Khot received the  Alan T. Waterman Award, which recognizes an early career scientist for their outstanding contributions in their respective field. The National Science Foundation citation for the Waterman  award states: "For unexpected and original contributions to computational complexity, notably the Unique Games Conjecture, and the resulting rich connections and consequences in optimization, computer science and mathematics".

Khot gave an invited talk at the International Congress of Mathematicians in 2010, on the topic of "Mathematical Aspects of Computer Science".

Khot was awarded the 2014 Rolf Nevanlinna Prize by the International Mathematical Union, for his work related to the Unique Games Conjecture, as well as for posing the conjecture itself. According to the International Mathematical Union citation, "he is awarded the Nevanlinna Prize for his prescient definition of the “Unique Games” problem, and leading the effort to understand its complexity and its pivotal role in the study of efficient approximation of optimization problems; his work has led to breakthroughs in algorithmic design and approximation hardness, and to new exciting interactions between computational complexity, analysis and geometry".

Khot received the MacArthur Fellowship (or "Genius Grant") in 2016. The MacArthur foundation states that these are "unrestricted fellowships to talented individuals who have shown extraordinary originality and dedication in their creative pursuits and a marked capacity for self-direction".

He was elected a Fellow of the Royal Society in 2017. Fellows are elected based on having made "a substantial contribution to the improvement of natural knowledge, including mathematics, engineering science and medical science".

References 

1978 births
Living people
Marathi people
Princeton University alumni
New York University faculty
IIT Bombay alumni
Theoretical computer scientists
University of Chicago faculty
International Mathematical Olympiad participants
Nevanlinna Prize laureates
American people of Indian descent
21st-century American mathematicians
21st-century Indian mathematicians
Fellows of the Royal Society
Simons Investigator
People from Ichalkaranji
MacArthur Fellows